Tommaso Feeny (1790-1873) was an Irish prelate who served as Bishop of Killala.

He was born in Clanmorris. Feeny was ordained priest on 10 July 1817. He was appointed titular bishop of Ptolemais in Thebaide on 30 July 1831; and Diocesan Bishop of Killala on 11 January 1848. He died on 9 June 1873.

References

Roman Catholic bishops of Killala
19th-century Roman Catholic bishops in Ireland
1790 births
1873 deaths
Religious leaders from County Mayo